Sheila Wills (born August 11, 1947) is an American actress, also known as Sheila DeWindt. She is known for her regular role on the television series B.J. and the Bear, and recurring roles on series including Days of Our Lives, Battlestar Galactica, and Generations.

Early life and education
Wills was born in Louisiana and raised in Los Angeles, California. She started working at a young age, stating in 1982, "I've had a job since I was 11 - it might have been waiting tables or cleaning houses... but it helped me attain a goal". Wills graduated from Occidental College, where she later became an assistant dean of admissions. She had always wanted to be an actress, and quit her job in education shortly after attending an actor's workshop in Los Angeles in 1975.

Career
Before landing the role of Angie on B.J. and the Bear, Wills made guest appearances on a number of television series, including Baretta, Kojak, Quincy, and The Six Million Dollar Man. Later television appearances included McClain's Law, The Jeffersons, and The A-Team. Wills has also modeled and appeared in commercials and films, including Goldengirl, Youngblood, and Airport '79.

Personal life
The actor's workshop Wills attended in 1975 was run by producer/director/actor Hal DeWindt. Wills and DeWindt married two years later. The couple divorced in 1981, and the actress returned to using the name Wills some years later. Following her divorce, Wills had a relationship with actor Philip Michael Thomas. Wills and Thomas had two children together, Melody and India.

Filmography (selected)

Film

Television

References

External links
 

American television actresses
African-American actresses
People from Los Angeles
Occidental College alumni
1947 births
Living people
Actresses from Los Angeles
21st-century African-American people
21st-century African-American women
20th-century African-American people
20th-century African-American women